Nuno Filipe Martins Rodrigues (born 14 November 1979 in Oeiras, Lisbon) is a Portuguese retired professional footballer who played as a left back.

External links

1979 births
Living people
People from Oeiras, Portugal
Portuguese footballers
Association football defenders
Liga Portugal 2 players
Segunda Divisão players
G.D. Estoril Praia players
S.C. Espinho players
S.C. Salgueiros players
F.C. Felgueiras players
Atlético Clube de Portugal players
Imortal D.C. players
F.C. Lixa players
Segunda División players
CD Badajoz players
Cypriot First Division players
Doxa Katokopias FC players
Othellos Athienou F.C. players
APEP FC players
Girabola players
C.R. Caála players
Portuguese expatriate footballers
Expatriate footballers in Spain
Expatriate footballers in Cyprus
Expatriate footballers in Angola
Portuguese expatriate sportspeople in Cyprus
Portuguese expatriate sportspeople in Angola
Sportspeople from Lisbon District